Kärra-Rödbo is one of the 21 boroughs of Gothenburg, Sweden. It is located in the northern part of the Hisingen island and has an area of 3 481 hectares, with about 11,000 inhabitants (2004).

Sports
The following sports clubs are located in Hisings Kärra:

Kärra KIF

External links
Göteborgs Stad Kärra-Rödbo

Boroughs of Gothenburg
Hisingen